The 1931 Washington University Bears football team was an American football team that represented Washington University in St. Louis as a member of the Missouri Valley Conference (MVC) during the 1931 college football season. In its fourth season under head coach Albert Sharpe, the team compiled a 2–7 record.

Schedule

References

Washington University
Washington University Bears football seasons
Washington University Bears football